The 2021 Garden Open was a professional tennis tournament played on clay courts. It was the twelfth edition of the tournament which was part of the 2021 ATP Challenger Tour. It took place in Rome, Italy between 19 and 25 April 2021.

Singles main-draw entrants

Seeds

 1 Rankings as of 12 April 2021.

Other entrants
The following players received wildcards into the singles main draw:
  Stefano Napolitano
  Andrea Pellegrino
  Giulio Zeppieri

The following player received entry into the singles main draw using a protected ranking:
  Thanasi Kokkinakis

The following player received entry into the singles main draw as a special exempt:
  Mathias Bourgue

The following players received entry into the singles main draw as alternates:
  Andrea Collarini
  Borna Gojo

The following players received entry from the qualifying draw:
  Flavio Cobolli
  Vít Kopřiva
  Tristan Lamasine
  Alex Molčan

Champions

Singles

   Andrea Pellegrino def.  Hugo Gaston 3–6, 6–2, 6–1.

Doubles

  Sadio Doumbia /  Fabien Reboul def.  Paolo Lorenzi /  Juan Pablo Varillas 7–6(7–5), 7–5.

References

2021 ATP Challenger Tour
2021
2021 in Italian tennis
April 2021 sports events in Italy